"Jing! Jingeling! Der Weihnachtsschnappi!" is a 2005 song released by animated German crocodile, Schnappi. It was the first single from the second album Schnappi's Winterfest and was released on November 25, 2005.

Song information
The song was written by Rosita Blissenbach and John D. Marks, produced by Iris Gruttmann, and, as the previous singles, performed by Joy Gruttmann. This Christmas song achieved a great success in Norway where it peaked at #3 for two weeks and stayed for five weeks in the top 20. It reached number 16 for two weeks in Austria and remained in the top 20 for fours weeks. It was also a top twenty hit in Germany, peaking at #17. It achieved a moderate success in Switzerland, Sweden and Belgium, staying the low positions. It was the last Schnappi's hit in Europe.

Track listings

 CD single
 "Jing! Jingeling! Der Weihnachtsschnappi!" (single version) — 2:10
 "Schlittenfahrt" (single version) — 3:31

 CD maxi
 "Jing! Jingeling! Der Weihnachtsschnappi!" (single version) — 2:15
 "Schlittenfahrt" (single version) — 4:45
 "Jing! Jingeling! Der Weihnachtsschnappi!" (DJ Schnappi mix) — 3:17
 "Schlittenfahrt" (karaoke version) — 4:45
 "Jing! Jingeling! Der Weihnachtsschnappi!" (karaoke version) — 2:15

Charts

References

Songs about reptiles
Songs about fictional male characters
2005 singles
Christmas songs
Schnappi songs
German-language songs
German children's songs
2005 songs